Thomas Byrne (born 6 May 1958) is a former racing driver from Ireland. He failed to finish in either of the Grands Prix he started and scored no Formula One championship points.

After performing well in the Irish Formula Ford Championship in 1981, Byrne won the 1982 British Formula 3 Championship even though he missed some races while he competed in Formula One. At that time, he also tested a McLaren MP4/1 Formula One car in October 1982 against Marlboro-backed Spirit Racing's European F2 drivers like Stefan Johansson and Thierry Boutsen.  After a brief return to Formula Three in 1983, where he raced for Eddie Jordan, Byrne moved to the United States and began racing in the American Racing Series in 1986, where he won ten races in 55 starts, both second place in the series record books. He also was the championship runner-up in 1988 and 1989. He raced in the series until 1992 and then retired. Despite his extended career in the States, Byrne never made a Champ Car start. He lives in Florida, and teaches Honda Teen/Adult Defensive Driving, Advanced Defensive Driving, Acura High Performance and Acura Advanced Performance Driving during the race season at the Mid-Ohio Sports Car Course in Lexington, Ohio. He is also a driver coach for Indy Lights team Brian Stewart Racing.
 
He co-authored a book with Mark Hughes which was released in the UK on 8 August 2008, titled Crashed and Byrned: The Greatest Racing Driver You Never Saw. The book won the William Hill Irish Sports Book of the Year for 2009.

Byrne was the subject of Seán Ó Cualáin's documentary Crash and Burn in 2016.

Racing record

Career summary

Complete Formula One results
(key)

References

External links
GP Encyclopedia
"Tommy Byrne, TNFer & award-winning author" on the Autosport's The Nostalgia Forum

1958 births
Living people
Irish racing drivers
Irish Formula One drivers
Theodore Formula One drivers
British Formula Three Championship drivers
Indy Lights drivers
SCCA Formula Super Vee drivers
Atlantic Championship drivers
People from Drogheda
International Formula 3000 drivers
Formula Ford drivers
Sportspeople from County Louth
People from Dundalk